Nina Terrero is an entertainment journalist and on-air reporter residing in New York City.

Early life
Born to parents of Puerto Rican and Dominican descent, Terrero was born and raised in central New Jersey.

Education
Terrero attended Cornell University, where she earned a degree in government with dual minors in Science & Technology Studies and Law & Society. As a junior in college, Terrero traveled abroad to study Asian Security and International Relations at University of St. Andrews in St. Andrews, Scotland. She is also a graduate of Columbia University, where she earned a master's degree in Government.

Career
Terrero began her career at ABC News. In 2011, Terrero transitioned to NBC Latino, a Hispanic-audience digital news property of NBC News. A member of NBC Latino’s founding team, Terrero produced the site’s original, multimedia celebrity, fashion, lifestyle and food features, with an emphasis on dynamic coverage of films, television, music, awards shows and entertainment news. An experienced on-air reporter, Terrero has interviewed Latino Hollywood’s biggest stars, including Jennifer Lopez, Sofia Vergara, Marc Anthony, Juanes, Javier Bardem and Zoe Saldana, all one-on-one interviews conducted with her signature bubbly personality and hard-hitting interview style. Terrero is currently a senior correspondent at Entertainment Weekly, where she covers film, TV, style and pop culture for both the brand's print magazine and digital news site. An accomplished on-air reporter and host, Terrero hosts various EW-branded video series on EW.com. She is also a regular fixture on Entertainment Weekly's channel on SiriusXM, where she can be heard interviewing celebrities and commenting on timely topics. In addition to her work as a reporter, host and interviewer, Terrero recaps television shows including "Jane The Virgin," "Tyrant" and  "The Royals". Terrero is a frequent guest and entertainment expert on both broadcast and cable television, filing appearances on shows including The View, The Wendy Williams Show, TODAY, The Insider, and more. She has also appeared as a co-host on PEOPLE's live stream news show People NOW—a show highlighting trending and breaking entertainment, lifestyle and hard news—and has also co-hosted NuvoTV's "The Collective," a cable show highlighting Latino newsmakers across entertainment.'
'

Awards
In 2012, Terrero was named one of Huffington Post's “50 Top Latino Voices to Follow on Twitter.”  She has also been recognized for her health reporting by the National Hispanic Medical Association with a “Public Health Education through Media Leadership” award. In May 2013, she was listed as a “Rising Star of Journalism” by the Huffington Post.

References

Living people
American women journalists
American people of Puerto Rican descent
American people of Dominican Republic descent
Columbia Graduate School of Arts and Sciences alumni
Cornell University alumni
Alumni of the University of St Andrews
Year of birth missing (living people)